Ernest Cutler Price (February 2, 1891 – August 7, 1942) better known as Jack Dillon, was an American boxer who held the Light Heavyweight Championship of the World. Dillon was often referred to as "Jack the Giant Killer" for his ability to handle the most dangerous heavyweights of his era. Ring Magazine founder Nat Fleischer ranked Dillon as the #3 Light Heavyweight of all-time, while boxing promoter Charley Rose placed him at #2. The International Boxing Research Organization rates Dillon as the 16th best Light-Heavyweight ever.  He was inducted into the Ring Magazine Hall of Fame in 1959 and the International Boxing Hall of Fame in 1995. His managers included Sam Murbarger, and later Steve Harter.

Early life and career

Price was born in Frankfort, Indiana, on February 2, 1891, where his father, who died when Price was young, ran a grocery.

Price took the name "Jack Dillon" from the famous racehorse, Sidney Lou Dillon. Price worked at the farm/stable where the horse was housed. At his first fight, Price appeared very nervous. When asked his name, he said Sidney Dillon. The referee misunderstood him, and bawled out "Jack Dillon!".

Taking the World Light Heavyweight Championship from Battling Levinsky

Dillon turned pro in 1908 and claimed the vacant World Light Heavyweight title with a win over Battling Levinsky on April 14, 1914 in a twelve-round points decision in Butte, Montana, though at the time his claim to the title was not universally recognized. The Los Angeles Times wrote of their title match that Dillon showed more aggression and tenacity than his opponent and that by the third Levinsky was showing signs of fatigue.

Dillon defeated Levinsky again on May 29, 1914 in a twelve-round points decision in Dillon's hometown of Indianapolis, Indiana.  With mixed results, Dillon had met Levinsky twice in his earlier career in October 1911 in Philadelphia, and April 1913 in Rochester.

Top competitors Dillon faced
Dillon truly fought the greatest competitors of his era, during the time of the greatest middleweights history had ever known.  He rarely if ever shirked a challenge. Between 1910 and 1918, Dillon fought the great middleweight champion George Chip twelve times, often beating him in newspaper decisions.  He fought hard punching German-American Middleweight Champion Frank Klaus four times between 1911 and 1913. He fought the great Billy Miske five times from 1916 to 1917 in hotly contested contests before large crowds, though Miske usually won.  He lost twice to Mike Gibbons, in the decision of most newspapers, in November 1916, and September 1917.  He fought Middleweight champion Al McCoy three times, impressively winning twice in ten round newspaper wins, once in Brooklyn in 1917, and once in Muncie, Indiana in August 1918.  On independence Day in 1918, Dillon and McCoy fought a close fight declared a draw in Charleston, South Carolina.

Losing the World Light Heavyweight Championship to Battling Levinsky

On October 24, 1916, Dillon lost the belt in a twelve-round points decision against Levinsky in Boston.  Dillon opened strongly but weakened in the final rounds when Levinsky landed blows to his face, jaw, and body.

Still facing tough competition, Dillon faced the great Middleweight Champion Harry Greb twice, once on July 30, 1917 in Pittsburgh, and once on March 14, 1918 in Toledo, Ohio.  Though losing in Pittsburgh by a wide margin, he was able to defend himself well against his opponent.  Later in Toledo in 1918, Dillon was pummeled more fiercely and seemed to have lost his championship form.

Dillon retired from the ring in 1923.

Life after boxing
Prior to prohibition, he operated a saloon in Indianapolis which eventually failed.

In retirement in Florida, Dillon lived next door to a restaurant that he owned and operated. Dillon died on August 7, 1942, at the State Hospital in Chattahoochee, Florida, where he had spent five months with an illness.   He was only 51 at the time of his death.

Professional boxing record
All information in this section is derived from BoxRec, unless otherwise stated.

Official record

All newspaper decisions are officially regarded as “no decision” bouts and are not counted in the win/loss/draw column.

Unofficial record

Record with the inclusion of newspaper decisions in the win/loss/draw column.

Primary boxing achievements

See also
List of light heavyweight boxing champions

References

External links
 
Jack Dillon - CBZ Profile
IBHOF Bio

1891 births
1942 deaths
Boxers from Indiana
International Boxing Hall of Fame inductees
Light-heavyweight boxers
People from Frankfort, Indiana
American male boxers
Businesspeople from Indianapolis
Businesspeople from Florida